Dillinger Four/Pinhead Gunpowder is a split EP by the American punk rock bands Dillinger Four and Pinhead Gunpowder. It was released on May 16, 2000 through Adeline Records.

Track listing

Dillinger Four
"Are You the Motherfucker With the Banana?"
"Thanks for Nothing, Part 2: The Revenge"

Pinhead Gunpowder
All songs written by Aaron Cometbus except where noted.

"At Your Funeral"
"Porch"
"Second Street" (Jason White)

References

Pinhead Gunpowder albums
Dillinger Four albums
Split EPs
Adeline Records EPs